William Otto Ernst Michaelis (19 July 1871 – 5 January 1948) was a German viceadmiral and head of the Naval Command within the Ministry of the Reichswehr in the Weimar Republic.

Biography 
Michaelis was born in Bischofsburg, East Prussia to a civil engineer, he graduated from high school with a first. He entered the Imperial German Navy as a Seeoffizieranwärter in April 1889 and was promoted to Unterleutnant zur See (equivalent to ensign) in 1892. He served at the rank of Unterleutnant zur See from 1900 to 1902 as a deck officer and commander with the 1st Torpedo Boat Division in Kiel. He also attended Kiel's Naval Academy from 1900 to 1902, leading to service with the Reichsmarineamt (RMA) as a head of department and with the Admiralty Staff. He then served as first officer of a capital ship then as staff officer to the admiral of a squadron. From 4 February 1915 through 28 January 1916 he served as chief of staff to the Commander of the High Seas Fleet, Admiral Hugo von Pohl.

Works 
"Kaiser Wilhelm II. und seine Marine. Kritische Beobachtungen während des Kaisermanövers in der Nordsee Herbst 1912. Aus den Erinnerungen von Vizeadmiral William Michaelis" (Kaiser Wilhelm II and his Navy - critical observations made during the royal manoeuvres in the North Sea in autumn 1912, from the memoirs of vice admiral William Michaelis), reprinted 1976
"Tirpitz' Wirken vor und während des Ersten Weltkriegs" (The Work of Tirpitz before and after the First World War), paper of 1934

Sources 
 Biography in "Die Akten der Reichskanzlei" in the Bundesarchiv
 Rahn, Werner: "Deutsche Marinen im Wandel. Vom Symbol nationaler Einheit zum Instrument internationaler Sicherheit", 2005, S. 397, S. 420 Anmerkungen

References

1871 births
1948 deaths
People from Biskupiec
Imperial German Navy admirals of World War I
Vice admirals of the Reichsmarine
People from the Province of Prussia